Ana Luz Lobato (born 27 April 1970) is a Mexican politician from the Institutional Revolutionary Party (formerly from the Party of the Democratic Revolution). From 2009 to 2012 she served as Deputy of the LXI Legislature of the Mexican Congress representing Guerrero.

References

1970 births
Living people
Politicians from Guerrero
Women members of the Chamber of Deputies (Mexico)
Institutional Revolutionary Party politicians
Party of the Democratic Revolution politicians
21st-century Mexican politicians
21st-century Mexican women politicians
Deputies of the LXI Legislature of Mexico
Members of the Chamber of Deputies (Mexico) for Guerrero